Plum Creek is a tributary of Little Shamokin Creek in Northumberland County, Pennsylvania, in the United States. It is a small, perennial stream and its valley was substantially colonized by the early 19th century. A number of bridges have been constructed over the creek.

Course

Plum Creek begins in a small pond in Shamokin Township. It flows northwest for several tenths of a mile before turning west. The creek then enters Rockefeller Township and turns west-southwest for more than a mile. The creek then turns west-northwest for several tenths of a mile receives two unnamed tributariesone from the left and one from the rightand turns west-southwest for several hundred feet before turning north for a few tenths of a mile. At this point, it turns west for several tenths of a mile and receives two unnamed tributaries from the right before turning northwest. Several hundred feet further downstream, the creek reaches its confluence with Little Shamokin Creek.

Hydrology
The impairment comes from siltation, organic enrichment, and low levels of dissolved oxygen and are due to grazing; however, the remaining  of the main stem are not designated as impaired.

Geography, geology, and watershed

Plum Creek is a small, perennial stream.

The mouth of the creek is in the United States Geological Survey quadrangle of Sunbury. However, its source is in the quadrangle of Trevorton.

The creek's mouth is near Pennsylvania Route 890.

Plum Creek has been used as a water supply for Sunbury. There are some reservoirs in the creek's watershed.

History
Plum Creek was entered into the Geographic Names Information System on August 2, 1979. Its identifier in the Geographic Names Information System is 1184112.

By the early 1800s, the valley of Plum Creek had some inhabitants and was one of the major points of colonization in the area, aside from Sunbury. Many Lutherans had colonized the area during this period. Plum Creek Road historically ran through the creek's valley and connected Tulpehocken Road (now Pennsylvania Route 890) with Old King's Highway (now Pennsylvania Route 61) and aided travel between Sunbury and Shamokin.

The Eden Evangelical Lutheran Church  was founded by inhabitants of the valley of Plum Creek in 1844, as there was no other church within several miles.

Agriculture was also being done in the valley of Plum Creek by the early 1800s. For instance, Henry Yoxtheimer, Sr., an early pioneer, farmed in the valley. Also, the 58-acre William Miller homestead historically existed at the headwaters of the creek. Parts of this valley were "fertile" and "well-cultivated" in the 19th and 20th centuries.

A number of bridges have been built over Plum Creek, including four in 1939 alone. A concrete slab bridge carrying State Route 4013 over Plum Creek was built in 1939 and repaired in 1997.

The name "Plum Creek" was erroneously given to another stream in the stream system of Little Shamokin Creek in a 1952 United States Geological Map of the Shamokin quadrangle. This error was noted in the late 1960s and was verified by two local farmers.

See also
List of rivers of Pennsylvania

References

Rivers of Northumberland County, Pennsylvania
Tributaries of Shamokin Creek
Rivers of Pennsylvania